Chinapulivarru is a village in Guntur district of the Indian state of Andhra Pradesh. It is located in Kollur mandal of Tenali revenue division.

Geography 

Climate 
Chinapulivarru has a temperate Tropical wet-dry, similar to much of Vijayawada. Monsoon season starts from second week June and rains continues till October. Despite its reputation being rainy water inundated village, Chinapulivarru has constantly does flood water management with associated state government schemes from 5 decades. Winter season starts from Deepavali around mid-November to mid-February. Summers are generally hot and suffocating due to high humidity levels in the air being the coastal to the Bay of Bengal sea. Chinapulivarru average later May temperate are highest for the season resulting sun strokes for few who expose to it. There were two natural calamities from cyclones devastating Chinapulivarru on 19 November 1977 and 5 May 1990. However the month November is having the history is Cyclones and major storms prone.

Demographics 

 census, Chinapulivarru had a population of 1,881. The total population constitute, 927 males and 954 females —a sex ratio of 1029 females per 1000 males. 129 children are in the age group of 0–6 years, of which 64 are boys and 65 are girls —a ratio of 1016 per 1000. The average literacy rate stands at 67.58% with 1,184 literates, approximately equal to the state average of 67.41%.

Governance 

Chinapulivarru gram panchayat is the local self-government of the village. It is divided into wards and each ward is represented by a ward member. The village forms a part of Andhra Pradesh Capital Region and is under the jurisdiction of APCRDA.

Economy 

Agriculture

The major occupation of the village is agriculture and the crops cultivated include, paddy.

Education 

As per the school information report for the academic year 2018–19, the village has 2 Mandal Parishad schools.

See also 
 List of villages in Guntur district

References 

Villages in Guntur district